Shahjahan Miah (born 10 January 1947) is a Bangladesh Nationalist Party politician. He was elected a member of parliament from Undivided Rajshahi-1 in 1979 and from Chapai Nawabganj-1 in 1991, 15 February 1996, 12 June 1996 and 2001 Bangladeshi general election. He was the organizer of the Liberation War of Bangladesh.

Early life 
Shahjahan Miah was born on 10 January 1947 in Shibganj Upazila of Chapai Nawabganj District. His father is Faiz Ahmed Mia and mother Naibor Nessa. He received his bachelor's and master's degree in economics from University of Rajshahi.

Career 
Shahjahan Miah is the president of Chapai Nawabganj district BNP. He was elected to parliament from Undivided Rajshahi-1 a Bangladesh Nationalist Party candidate in 1979 Bangladeshi general election. He was elected a member of parliament for Chapai Nawabganj-1 as a Bangladesh Nationalist Party candidate in 1991, 15 February 1996, 12 June 1996 and 2001 Bangladeshi general election.

References 

1947 births
Living people
People from Chapai Nawabganj district
University of Rajshahi alumni
Bangladesh Nationalist Party politicians
2nd Jatiya Sangsad members
5th Jatiya Sangsad members
6th Jatiya Sangsad members
7th Jatiya Sangsad members
8th Jatiya Sangsad members